CMOT can be the initials of:

 Children's Museum of Taipei, a former museum in Taipei, Taiwan
 Common management information protocol over TCP/IP, an architecture for managing a network remotely
 Computational and Mathematical Organization Theory, an academic journal
 Cut-Me-Own-Throat Dibbler, the fictional salesman